Ground Equipment Facility J-36A (San Clemente Island Air Force Station until 1960) is a Federal Aviation Administration (FAA) radar station of the Joint Surveillance System (JSS) in the Western Air Defense Sector (WADS) of NORAD.

History
In World War II, Los Angeles Harbor Defenses included posts on some islands of Southern California, e.g. in March 1942, "a 200-man Army detachment set up two radar stations" on San Clemente Island, and in March 1944, Navy "Seabees built two permanent radar installations on the island."

USAF radar station
San Clemente Island Air Force Station was Permanent System radar station LP-39 which began operations in November 1951 with an AN/TPS-1C general surveillance radar.  Designated as one of two offshore radar stations at the Southern California coast, the 670th Aircraft Control and Warning Squadron was activated at the station on 1 February 1952 by the 27th Air Division.  As an AC&W radar station, the facility provided radar tracks for a Manual Air Defense Control Center to direct Ground control interception (GCI) of unidentified aircraft.

The Air Force Station was upgraded to designation P-39 with a single AN/FPS-3 radar in May 1952 and an AN/FPS-4 height-finding radar the following year. In 1955 an AN/FPS-8 was added and subsequently converted to an AN/GPS-3 and in 1956, an AN/FPS-6 height-finder replaced the AN/FPS-4. As with other Air Defense Command stations replaced by facilities of the joint-use site system (JUSS), San Clemente Island AFS was replaced in 1960, and 670th operations moved to the JUSS RP-39 station at San Pedro Hill AFS with barracks at Fort MacArthur near the Project Nike direction center (part of the Los Angeles Air Defense Area).  

In 1960, San Clemente Island transferred to the Navy and the USAF operations building was subsequently used as a Navy photo lab (the AFS site is vacant, deteriorating and difficult to reach.)

USGS radar station
In 1966 (July 30-August 9), field activity D-4-66-SC of the United States Geological Survey in the Coastal and Marine Geology Program used San Clemente Island with a Western Electric M-33 radar for a study of the Bathymetry and Structure of San Clemente Island (e.g., the "CURV vehicle of Naval Undersea Research and Development Center, was...used for seafloor sampling.")

Mount Thirst radar station
In 1972 south of the former AFS, the Navy installed an AN/FPS-20 general surveillance radar  at Mount Thirst.  The FPS-20 was later modified to an AN/FPS-93A in an Arctic Tower for range safety and bombing exercises.

Joint Surveillance System
In the late 1990s, an Air Route Surveillance Radar (ARSR-4) radar at Mount Thirst replaced the AN/FPS-93A, and is now shared with the Air Force for the JSS program (the FAA maintains the radar for the Navy, but reportedly does not use the data).

Station Tombstone
The late 1980s Station Tombstone Radar, an AN/SPS-73 surface search radar, is located north of Mt. Thirst.

References

Joint Surveillance System radar stations